Penicillium estinogenum is an anamorph species of the genus of Penicillium which produces verruculogen.

See also
 List of Penicillium species

References

estinogenum
Fungi described in 1963